Łukasz Kubot and Oliver Marach were the defending champions, but they chose to not compete this year.
Andre Begemann and Leonardo Tavares won in the final 6–1, 6–7(6), [10–8], against Greg Ouellette and Adil Shamasdin.

Seeds

Draw

Draw

References
 Doubles Draw

Abierto Internacional Varonil Casablanca Cancun - Doubles
Abierto Internacional Varonil Casablanca Cancún